William Lindsay Osteen Jr. (born August 8, 1960) is a United States district judge of the United States District Court for the Middle District of North Carolina.

Education and career

Osteen was born in Greensboro, North Carolina. He received a Bachelor of Science degree from University of North Carolina at Chapel Hill in 1983. He received a Juris Doctor from University of North Carolina School of Law in 1987. He was in private practice of law in Greensboro from 1987 to 2007.

Federal judicial service

Osteen serves as a United States District Judge of the United States District Court for the Middle District of North Carolina. Osteen was nominated by President George W. Bush on January 9, 2007, to a seat vacated by his father, William Lindsay Osteen Sr. He was confirmed by the United States Senate on September 10, 2007, and received his commission on September 19, 2007. He served as Chief Judge from November 1, 2012 to November 3, 2017. He struck down North Carolina's 'life of the mother only' 20-week abortion ban in March 2019. His judgement pushed the date of which abortions could be performed to the date of viability, which is later for many women. However, Osteen reinstated the NC 20-week abortion ban, with exceptions for urgent medical emergencies, after the June 2022 U.S. Supreme Court decision overturning Roe v. Wade which erased the legal foundation for his 2019 ruling that had struck down the 1973 state law. Judge Osteen stated “Neither this court, nor the public, nor counsel, nor providers have the right to ignore the rule of law as determined by the Supreme Court."

Sources

References

1960 births
Living people
Judges of the United States District Court for the Middle District of North Carolina
United States district court judges appointed by George W. Bush
21st-century American judges
University of North Carolina alumni
University of North Carolina School of Law alumni
People from Greensboro, North Carolina